A tortured artist is a stock character and stereotype who is in constant torment due to frustrations with art, other people, or the world in general. The trope is often associated with mental illness.

Background 
The trope of the tortured artist is thought to have been started by Plato.

Creativity and mental illness have been connected over time. Some mental disorders, such as bipolar disorder and schizophrenia, have been said to have helped popular artists with their works. One of the most known "tortured artists" is Vincent van Gogh, who experts consider to have suffered from psychosis.

Another figure matching the description of the "tortured artist" is Ludwig van Beethoven, who, after losing his hearing, became increasingly reclusive and apathetic towards society. In the Heiligenstadt Testament, Beethoven confesses his loss of hearing to his brothers Nikolaus and Kaspar and tells them of his inability to converse regularly anymore as well as his contemplation of suicide. Towards the end of his life, Beethoven used conversation books to interact with his friends and acquaintances.

Criticism and research 

The trope has been criticized for romanticizing mental illness, treating it as a necessary ingredient for creativity. According to a study conducted at the University of Southampton, artwork is perceived to be superior if the observer is told that the artist is mentally ill. However, research has found that famous artists' less renowned work was produced when their mental illness was the most acute.

Multiple studies have found that rates of mental illness were several times greater than average in creative professions. According to Victoria Tischler of the University of West London, creative fields often have low wages and long working hours, leading to poor mental health.

See also 

 Poète maudit
 Self-destructive behaviour
 Starving artist
 Sylvia Plath effect
 27 Club

References

Further reading
  – looks at the relationship between bipolar disorder and artistic creativity. It contains a number of case histories of dead people who are described as probably having suffered from bipolar disorder.
  – shows the universal nature of the tortured artist stereotype and how it applies to all of the creative disciplines, including film, theater, literature, music and visual art. The artists profiled in the book have generally made major contributions to their respective mediums (Charles M. Schulz, Charlie Parker, Lenny Bruce, Michelangelo, Kurt Cobain, Madonna, Andy Warhol, Amy Winehouse, Ernest Hemingway and dozens of others), but the book shows how, in each case, their art was inspired by pain and suffering.

Stock characters
Creativity and mental illness